Spodnje Dule is a settlement in the hills northwest of Leskovec pri Krškem in the Municipality of Krško in eastern Slovenia. The area is part of the traditional region of Lower Carniola and is now included with the rest of the municipality in the Lower Sava Statistical Region.

Name
The name of the settlement was changed from Spodnje Dole to Spodnje Dule in 1990.

References

External links
Spodnje Dule on Geopedia

Populated places in the Municipality of Krško